Candona is a genus of ostracods in the family Candonidae.

Taxonomy 
The following species are recognised in the genus Candona: 

Candona artesensis 
Candona chusanhai 
Candona condensa 
Candona elliptica 
Candona gregaria 
Candona lupinia 
Candona neglecta 
Candona nobilis 
Candona parasinuosa 
Candona patzcuaro 
Candona pitangaensis 
Candona quasiincarum 
Candona redunca 
Candona rupestris
Candona shitsyi 
Candona verretensis

References 

 Karanovic, I.; Datry, T. 2009: Overview of Candoninae (Crustacea, Ostracoda) of South America and the West Indies, with the description of two new species and one new genus. Zootaxa, 2267,pages 1–25

External links 
 
 
 
 
 Candona at insectoid.info

Candonidae
Podocopida genera